Marian Cunningham (born 23 November 1951) is a Peruvian equestrian. She competed in the individual dressage event at the 1984 Summer Olympics. She also competed at the 1983 Pan American Games in Venezuela.

Cunningham is active as international judge on 4* level and has judged many Concours de Dressage International (CDIs) and several major championships in dressage around the world.

References

External links
 

1951 births
Living people
Peruvian female equestrians
Peruvian dressage riders
Olympic equestrians of Peru
Equestrians at the 1984 Summer Olympics
Equestrians at the 1983 Pan American Games
Place of birth missing (living people)
Pan American Games competitors for Peru